Otto Soglow (December 23, 1900 – April 3, 1975) was an American cartoonist best known for his comic strip The Little King.

Born in Yorkville, Manhattan, Soglow grew up in New York City, where he held various jobs as a teenager and made an unsuccessful effort to become an actor. His first job was painting designs on baby rattles. While studying with John Sloan at the Art Students League of New York, his first cartoon was printed in 1919. Throughout the 1920s, his drawings were seen in numerous magazines.

Soglow's artwork was published in New Masses, New York World, Collier's, The New Yorker, Judge and Life. He illustrated more than 35 books, and did five books of his own, including Wasn't the Depression Terrible? (1934).

The Little King

His character The Little King first appeared in The New Yorker in 1930. William Randolph Hearst lured Soglow away for his King Features Syndicate, but contractual obligations to The New Yorker prevented The Little King from appearing immediately. Soglow then produced a knock-off strip called The Ambassador from 1933 to 1934. After The Little King debuted on September 9, 1934, it ran until Soglow's death in 1975. It is still available today through King Features' email service, DailyINK.

National Cartoonists Society

In 1941, Soglow lived at 330 West 72nd Street in Manhattan. He was a co-founder of the National Cartoonists Society and served as president for the 1953–54 term.

He died in New York City in 1975. Otto and Annie Soglow had one daughter, Tona.

Awards
He received the National Cartoonists Society's Reuben Award in 1966, followed by their Elzie Segar Award in 1972.

See also
Harry Hanan
Henning Dahl Mikkelsen

External links
 Lambiek
 Reuben bio
 Toonopedia
 NCS Awards
 Collection of mid-twentieth century advertising featuring Otto Soglow illustrations from the TJS Labs Gallery of Graphic Design.
 Comrades in Art: Otto Soglow
 Historic film footage shows Otto Soglow drawing and talking at the American Theatre Wing Merchant Seaman's Club, NY, during World War 2

1900 births
1975 deaths
American cartoonists
American comics artists
Burials at Ferncliff Cemetery
The New Yorker cartoonists
Reuben Award winners
People from Yorkville, Manhattan